The Yokuts (previously known as Mariposas) are an ethnic group of Native Americans native to central California. Before European contact, the Yokuts consisted of up to 60 tribes speaking several related languages. Yokuts is both plural and singular; Yokut, while common, is erroneous. 'Yokut' should only be used when referring specifically to the Tachi Yokut Tribe of Lemoore. Some of their descendants prefer to refer to themselves by their respective tribal names; they reject the term  Yokuts, saying that it is an exonym invented by English-speaking settlers and historians. Conventional sub-groupings include the Foothill Yokuts, Northern Valley Yokuts, and Southern Valley Yokuts.

History 
Another name used to refer to the Yokuts was Mariposans. The endonym "Yokuts" itself means "people." There are many stories, depending on the tribe, on how the Yokuts and their land came to be but most follow a similar form.

The creation story- Once the world was completely covered in water. Then came an eagle and a crow. As they were flying they came upon a duck and asked the duck to bring up mud from the water so there can be land again. The duck did as he was asked and this mud became the land of the Yokuts. More specifically the Sierra Nevada Mountains and the Coast Mountain Range. To this day the crow and the eagle continue to be symbolic figures in Yokuts religious ceremonies.

Pre-Contact 
Yokuts life was rather peaceful, there were about 50 sub-tribes with up to 350 people in each tribe. In Yokuts culture men and women had different responsibilities. Men usually did the hunting, fishing, and building while the women gathered, maintained the home, and cared for the children. Divorce was not difficult to achieve and could be done for a number of reasons including affairs, laziness, and infertility.

Art expression among the Yokuts included music, singing, and painting. Basket making was also a way for the Yokuts to show their artistic skills by weaving designs and images into the baskets. Other forms of expression were done on the bodies of the Yokuts, such as tattoos and piercings.

The Yokuts had two important religious ceremonies they partook in, the annual mourning rite and the first fruit rite. Shamans were important to the Yokuts as they were believed to have supernatural powers, helped conduct ceremonies, and were able to treat the sick. However, shamans were able to use their power for good or evil and depending on how they used their power they could be executed.

During Contact 
The first time the Yokuts encountered Europeans was in 1772, when Spanish troops were in the area searching for soldiers. In the 19th century, missions were introduced by the Spanish and as they expanded they forced the Yokuts to work the land for farming. The harsh working conditions along with disease and abuse led to the death of many Indians. With their work force dwindling the missions moved further inland forcing those they encountered to convert and work.

In 1833, malaria was brought by British fur traders, spreading through the native population through their use of the sweat houses. This decrease in population left the Yokuts weak in numbers when gold was discovered bringing with it more foreigners.

Gold was discovered in California in 19th century. The 1850s were a devastating time for California Indians due to the incursion of European  settlers into their homelands, who enslaved or killed the natives in great number. The Gold rush left the Yokuts with no land and a large decrease in their population. In 1853 malaria spread once again among the Yokuts killing more natives, by 1854 what was left of the Yokuts tribe were forced to move to the Fort Tejon Reservation. A few years later the reservation was attacked by white vigilantes who killed most of the inhabitants and by 1859 the reservation was completely abandoned. The Tule reservation was established in 1873 and many Yokuts moved to that reservation. Disease, violence, and relocation severely diminished the Yokuts population so much that today their numbers do not even come close to what they once were.

Population

Estimates for the pre-contact populations of most native groups in California have varied substantially (See Population of Native California). Alfred L. Kroeber in 1925 put the 1770 population of the Yokuts at 18,000.

Several subsequent investigators suggested that the total should be substantially higher. Robert F. Heizer and Albert B. Elsasser 1980 suggested that the Yokuts had numbered about 70,000. They had one of the highest regional population densities in pre-contact North America.

The federal government, which had recently acquired California after defeating Mexico in the Mexican War, signed a treaty (one of eighteen such treaties signed state-wide, setting aside seven and a half percent of California's land area) defining a proposed reservation and two hundred head of cattle per year.

The U.S. Senate failed to ratify any of the eighteen treaties in a secret vote cast on July 8, 1852, with every member either abstaining or voting no. The result of the vote was not made public until 1905. The newly organized state government took a different approach. In 1851, California Governor Peter Burnett said that unless the Indians were moved east of the Sierras, "a war of extermination would continue to be waged until the Indian race should become extinct".

Over the course of the next 50 years, settlers and eventually the California State Militia would wage war on the Yokuts and other native tribes in what became known as the Californian Genocide. The Yokuts were reduced by around 93% between 1850 and 1900, with many of the survivors being forced into indentured servitude sanctioned by the California State Act for the Government and Protection of Indians. A few Valley Yokuts remain, the most prominent tribe among them being the Tachi. Kroeber estimated the population of the Yokuts in 1910 as 600.

Today about 2,000 Yokuts are enrolled in the federally recognized tribe. An estimated 600 Yokuts are said to belong to unrecognized tribes.

Territory
Yokuts tribes populated the San Joaquin Valley, from the Sacramento-San Joaquin River Delta ("the delta") south to Bakersfield and the adjacent foothills of the Sierra Nevada mountain range, which lies to the east.

In the northern half of the Yokuts region, some tribes inhabited the foothills of the Coast Range to the west. There is evidence of Yokuts inhabiting the Carrizo Plain and creating rock art in the Painted Rock area.

Language
According to San Diego State University, the Yokutsan languages are members of the Penutian language family.

Diet
Yokuts used spears, basket traps, and assorted other tools to hunt a variety of local animals, such as game birds, waterfowl, rabbits, turtles, various fish, mussels, and wasp grubs. Big game was hunted less frequently, but included deer, elk, and antelope. Their staple food was derived from acorn mash, though they also gathered tule roots and iris bulbs to make flour. Other foraged food includes manzanita berries, pine nuts, and seeds. They used a form of horticulture to cultivate tobacco. Salt came from salt grass.

Communities

Yokuts bands

 Gashowu
 Choinumni
 Chukchansi (Mono language name: wowa)
 Lakisamni
 Tachi tribe (Tache)
 Wukchumni
 Chaushila (Chowchilla)

Contemporary tribes
 Santa Rosa Rancheria (Tachi)
 Picayune Rancheria of Chukchansi Indians
 Table Mountain Rancheria (Mono)
 Tejon Indian Tribe of California
 Tule River Indian Tribe of the Tule River Reservation
 Tuolumne Rancheria

The contemporary Wukchumni and Choinumni communities do not yet have federal recognition.

As of the 2010 census there are a total of 6,273 people who identify as Yokuts. Many of them live on reservations that have casinos, these casinos have been essential to providing the Yokuts with jobs, money. and healthcare.

Trading routes 
The Yokuts tribe of California are known to have engaged in trading with other California tribes of Native Americans in the United States including coastal peoples like, for example, the Chumash tribe of the Central California coast, and they are known to have traded plant and animal products.

Other items part of Yokuts trade included salts, soap stones, and obsidian. They used marine shells as a form of money showing they had a functional monetary system in place.

Internal conflicts within the Chukchansi tribe near Yosemite

On April 5, 2015, it was reported that members of the Chukchansi tribe near Yosemite have been disenrolling other members from the tribe for decades, so that the tribe's casino profits go to fewer people. In the autumn of 2014, several disenrolled Chukchansi tribe members (who were no longer receiving a share of casino profits) arrived at the Chukchansi Gold Resort & Casino armed with guns, and violence ensued. As a result, a federal judge ordered that the casino be shut down. The casino reopened on December 31, 2015, and a formal Grand Reopening Ceremony took place on January 15, 2016.

Notable Yokuts
 Estanislao
 Clay James

Tribal government
Every tribe has a Head Chief, Winatun, and a Village Chief.

-Researched by Mary Ann Brensel

Gallery

See also
 Yokuts traditional narratives
 Thomas Jefferson Mayfield

Notes

References
 Kroeber, A. L. 1910. On the Evidences of Occupation of Certain Regions by the Miwok Tribes, University of California Press, Berkeley, Vol. 6 No. 3 p. 370 
 Kroeber, A. L. 1925. Handbook of the Indians of California. Bureau of American Ethnology Bulletin No. 78. Washington, D.C.
 Pritzker, Barry M. 2000. A Native American Encyclopedia: History, Culture, and Peoples. Oxford University Press, Oxford. .
 Heizer, R. F., and A. B. Elsasser 1980. The Natural World of the California Indians, University of California Press, Berkeley. .

External links

 Tachi Yokut Tribal website
 Info About Yokuts, by the Minnesota State University
 Culture and History, by Native Languages of the Americas

Further reading
 Baumhoff, Martin A. 1963."Ecological Determinants of Aboriginal California Populations". University of California Publications in American Archaeology and Ethnology 49:155–236.
 Cook, Sherburne F. 1955. "The Aboriginal Population of the San Joaquin Valley, California". Anthropological Records 16:31–80. University of California, Berkeley.
 
 Heizer, Robert F., and Albert B. Elsasser. 1980. The Natural World of the California Indians. University of California Press, Berkeley.
 Powell, John Wesley 1891. Indian Linguistic Families Of America, North Of Mexico, Government Printing Office, Washington, pages 90–91.
 Wallace, William J. 1978. "Southern Valley Yokuts". In California, edited by Robert F. Heizer, pp. 448–469. Handbook of North American Indians, William C. Sturtevant, general editor, vol. 8. Smithsonian Institution, Washington, D.C.
 Webb, Frederick 1910. 'Tachi' and 'Tammukan', in Handbook of American Indians North of Mexico, Government Printing Office.Handbook of American Indians North of Mexico: N-Z

 
California Mission Indians
Native American tribes in California
History of the San Joaquin Valley
History of the Sierra Nevada (United States)
Tulare Basin watershed